Brandolini's law, also known as the bullshit asymmetry principle, is an internet adage that emphasizes the effort of debunking misinformation, in comparison to the relative ease of creating it in the first place. It states that "The amount of energy needed to refute bullshit is an order of magnitude bigger than that needed to produce it."

Environmental researcher Dr. Phil Williamson of University of East Anglia implored other scientists to get online and refute falsehoods to their work whenever possible, despite the difficulty per Brandolini's Law. He wrote, "the scientific process doesn't stop when results are published in a peer-reviewed journal. Wider communication is also involved, and that includes ensuring not only that information (including uncertainties) is understood, but also that misinformation and errors are corrected where necessary."

Origins
The adage was publicly formulated the first time in January 2013 by Alberto Brandolini, an Italian programmer. Brandolini stated that he was inspired by reading Daniel Kahneman's Thinking, Fast and Slow right before watching an Italian political talk show with former Prime Minister Silvio Berlusconi and journalist Marco Travaglio.

Examples 

The persistent claim that vaccines cause autism is a prime example of Brandolini's law. The false claims, despite extensive investigation showing no relationship, have had a disastrous impact on public health. Decades of research and attempts to educate the public have failed to eradicate the misinformation.

In another example, shortly after the Boston Marathon bombing, the claim that a student who had survived the Sandy Hook Elementary School shooting had been killed by the bombing began to spread across social media. Despite many attempts to debunk the rumor, including an investigation by Snopes, the false story was shared by more than 92,000 people and was covered by major news agencies.

In an example of Brandolini's law during the COVID-19 pandemic, a journalist at Radio-Canada said, "It took this guy 15 minutes to make his video and it took me three days to fact-check."

The yoga scholar-practitioners Mark Singleton and Borayin Larios write that several of their colleagues have "privately" expressed their "aversion to public debate" with non-scholars because of Brandolini's law.

See also 
 Burden of proof
 False balance
 Gish gallop
 Hitchens's razor
 List of eponymous laws
 Poe's law

References

Adages
Internet terminology
Asymmetry
Eponyms
2013 neologisms